Steve Edmed (born 10 February 1968) is an Australian former professional rugby league footballer who played in the 1980s and 1990s.

Playing career
He made his first grade debut for the Balmain Tigers in Round 3 of the 1988 NSWRL season. That season, he came off the bench in the Tigers' Grand Final loss to the Canterbury-Bankstown Bulldogs. 

In 1989, Edmed became a starting prop for the Tigers, playing 18 games, including the club's Grand Final loss to the Canberra Raiders. Over then next six seasons, Edmed remained a regular starter for Balmain. He left the club at the end of the 1995 season, having played 136 games.

In 1996, Edmed joined the North Queensland Cowboys. Edmed was one of the major beneficiaries of the Super League war, reportedly signed to a $225,000 per year contract with the club. 

He played 21 games for the Cowboys that season, winning the club's Player of the Year and Players' Player awards. Graham Lowe, the Cowboys head coach in 1996, later said, "You heard criticism about the money Super League paid him but his effort and consistent performances were terrific. He was worth every cent and I think he was as good as any prop that season."

In 1997, Edmed signed with the Sheffield Eagles in the Super League, spending one season at the club before retiring due to a neck injury.

Achievements and accolades

Individual
North Queensland Cowboys Player of the Year: 1996
North Queensland Cowboys Players' Player: 1996

Statistics

NSWRL/ARL

Personal life
Edmed's son, Tane, played SG Ball Cup for the Balmain Tigers and is currently in the NSW Waratahs academy.

References

1968 births
Living people
Australian rugby league players
Balmain Tigers players
North Queensland Cowboys players
Sheffield Eagles
Rugby league players from Sydney
Rugby league props